The University of British Columbia (UBC) is a public research university with campuses near Vancouver and in Kelowna, British Columbia. Established in 1908, it is British Columbia's oldest university. The university ranks among the top three universities in Canada. With an annual research budget of $759million, UBC funds over 8,000 projects a year.

UBC is home to TRIUMF, Canada's national laboratory for particle and nuclear physics, which houses the world's largest cyclotron. In addition to the Peter Wall Institute for Advanced Studies and Stuart Blusson Quantum Matter Institute, UBC and the Max Planck Society collectively established the first Max Planck Institute in North America, specializing in quantum materials. One of the largest research libraries in Canada, the UBC Library system has over 9.9million volumes among its 21 branches. The Okanagan campus, acquired in 2005, is located in Kelowna, British Columbia.

Eight Nobel laureates, 74 Rhodes scholars, 65 Olympians garnering medals, ten fellows in both American Academy of Arts & Sciences and the Royal Society, and 273 fellows to the Royal Society of Canada have been affiliated with UBC. Three Canadian prime ministers, including Canada's first female prime minister, Kim Campbell, and current prime minister, Justin Trudeau, have been educated at UBC.

History

Foundation and early years

In 1877, six years after British Columbia joined Canada, the Superintendent of Education, John Jessop, submitted a proposal for the formation of a provincial University. The provincial legislature passed An Act Respecting the University of British Columbia in 1890, but disagreements arose over whether to build the university on Vancouver Island or the mainland.

The British Columbia University Act of 1908 formally called a provincial University into being, although its location was not specified.  The governance was modelled on the provincial University of Toronto Act of 1906 which created a bicameral system of university government consisting of a senate (faculty), responsible for academic policy, and a board of governors (citizens) exercising exclusive control over financial policy and having formal authority in all other matters. The president, appointed by the board, was to provide a link between the two bodies and to perform institutional leadership. The Act constituted a twenty-one member senate with Francis Carter-Cotton of Vancouver as chancellor.

Before the University Act, there had been several attempts at creating a degree-granting university with help from the universities of Toronto and McGill. Columbian College in New Westminster, through its affiliation with Victoria College of the University of Toronto, began to offer university-level credit at the turn-of-the-century, but McGill came to dominate higher education in the early 1900s.

Building on a successful affiliation between Vancouver and Victoria high schools with McGill University, Henry Marshall Tory helped establish the McGill University College of British Columbia. From 1906 to 1915, McGill BC (as it was called) operated as a private institution providing the first few years toward a degree at McGill University or elsewhere. The Henry Marshall Tory Medal was established in 1941 by Tory, founding president of the University of Alberta and of the National Research Council of Canada, and a co-founder of Carleton University. 

In the meantime, appeals were made to the government to revive the earlier legislation for a provincial institution, leading to the University Endowment Act in 1907, and the University Act in 1908. In 1910 the Point Grey site was chosen, and the government appointed Dr. Frank Fairchild Wesbrook as president in 1913, and Leonard Klinck as dean of Agriculture in 1914. A declining economy and the outbreak of war in August 1914 compelled the university to postpone plans for building at Point Grey, and instead the former McGill University College site at Fairview became home to the university until 1925. On the first day of lectures, September 30, 1915, the new independent university absorbed McGill University College. The University of British Columbia awarded its first degrees in 1916, and Klinck became the second president in 1919, serving until 1944.

In 1917 Evlyn Fenwick Farris became the first woman in Canada to be appointed to the board of governors of a university — a founding governor of UBC. She was also the first woman to be appointed to the UBC Senate. Active in its formation, the University Women's Club of Vancouver considered UBC as its "godchild".

Move to Point Grey
World War I dominated campus life and the student body was "decimated" by enlistments for active service, with three hundred male UBC students in Company "D" alone. By the war's end 697 male members of the university had enlisted. 109 students graduated in the three war-time congregations, all but one in the Faculty of Arts and Science.

By 1920, the university had only three faculties: Arts, Applied Science, and Agriculture (with Departments of Agronomy, Animal Husbandry, Dairying, Horticulture and Poultry). It only awarded the degrees of Bachelor of Arts (BA), Bachelor of Applied Science (BASc), and Bachelor of Science in agriculture (BSA). There were 576 male students and 386 female students in the 1920–21 winter session, but only 64 academic staff, including 6 women.

In the early part of the 20th century, professional education expanded beyond the traditional fields of theology, law and medicine. Although UBC did not offer degrees in these fields, it began to offer degrees in new professional areas such as engineering, agriculture, nursing and school teaching. It also introduced graduate training based on the German-inspired American model of specialized course work and the completion of a research thesis, with students completing M.A. degrees in natural sciences, social sciences, and humanities.

In 1922, the twelve-hundred-strong student body embarked on a "Build the University" campaign. Students marched through the streets of Vancouver to draw attention to their plight, enlist popular support, and embarrass the government. Fifty-six thousand signatures were presented at legislature in support of the campaign, which was ultimately successful. On September 22, 1925, lectures began at the new Point Grey campus. Except for the library, Science and Power House buildings, all the campus buildings were temporary constructions. Students built two playing fields, but the university had no dormitories and no social centre. Still, the university continued to grow steadily.

Soon, however, the effects of the depression began to be felt. The provincial government, upon which the university depended heavily, cut the annual grant severely. In 1932–33, salaries were cut by up to 23%. Posts remained vacant, and a few faculty lost their jobs. Most graduate courses were dropped. In 1935, the university established the Department of Extension. Just as things began to improve, World War II began and Canada declared war on September 10, 1939. Soon afterwards, University President Klinck wrote:

From the day of the declaration of war, the University has been prepared to put at the disposal of the Government all possible assistance by way of laboratories, equipment and trained personnel, insofar as such action is consistent with the maintenance of reasonably efficient instructional standards. To do less would be unthinkable.

Heavy rains and melting snowfall eroded a deep ravine across the north end of the campus, in the Grand Campus Washout of 1935. The campus did not have storm drains, and surface runoff went down a ravine to the beach. The resulting gully eventually consumed , two bridges, and buildings near Graham House. The university was closed for 4 and a half days. Afterwards, the gully was filled with debris from a nearby landslide, and only traces are visible today.

Military training on the campus became popular, then mandatory. WWII marked the first provision of money from the federal government to the university for research purposes. This laid a foundation for future research grants from the federal government of Canada.

Postwar years
By the end of World War II, Point Grey's facilities could not meet the influx of veterans returning to their studies. The university needed new staff, courses, faculties, and buildings for teaching and accommodation. The student population rose from 2,974 in 1944–45 to 9,374 in 1947–48. Surplus Army and Air Force camps were used for both classrooms and accommodation. The university took over fifteen complete camps during the 1945–46 session, with a sixteenth camp on Little Mountain, in Vancouver, converted into suites for married students. Most of the camps were dismantled and carried by barge or truck to the university where the huts were scattered across the campus.

Student numbers hit 9,374 in 1948; more than 53% of the students were war veterans in 1947–67. Between 1947 and 1951, the university built twenty new permanent buildings, including the War Memorial Gym, built with money raised primarily by the students, was dedicated on October 26, 1951.

In the 1961–62 academic year, the university had an enrolment of 12,602 students, including 798 graduate students. The next year, the single-University policy in the West was changed as existing colleges of the provincial Universities gained autonomy as Universities – the University of Victoria was established in 1963.

Recent history

Prime Minister Pierre Trudeau announced the creation of the Museum of Anthropology at UBC on July 1, 1971. At a construction cost of $2.5million the museum building, designed by Arthur Erickson, opened in 1976. That same year, the university launched a normal school program under the direction of Sally Rogow to train educators methods to teach students with multiple disabilities or were visually impaired.

In 1993 UBC concluded its "World of Opportunity" capital campaign that started in 1988. In total the university raised $262 million for the campaign. An additional $72 million in "non-campaign fundraising" was also raised. During the administration of President Strangway, UBC abandoned its previous design and planning process and private donors started to have more influence on building design.

In 2015 UBC concluded its "Start an Evolution" capital campaign. The campaign's quiet phase started in April 2008 and it launched publicly in September 2011. The initial goal was to raise $1.5 billion. The campaign surpassed that goal and raised 1.624 billion.

UBC's 15th president was Professor Santa J. Ono. He assumed the presidency on August 15, 2016. He served previously as the 28th president of the University of Cincinnati. Dr. Martha Piper – who served as the 11th president of the university – served as interim president from September 1, 2015, to June 30, 2016, following the resignation of Dr. Arvind Gupta.

In early May 2020, UBC announced it would be holding a virtual graduation for the class of 2020 amid concerns over the COVID-19 pandemic. The university received $419,248 from the Government of Canada to promote uptake of COVID-19 vaccines among public health leaders, community figures, Indigenous peoples, and leadership in municipal government.

On October 3, 2022, Dr. Deborah Buszard was appointed interim President and Vice-Chancellor of UBC.

Campuses

Vancouver

It lies on unceded territory of the Musqueam people. It is near several beaches and has views of the North Shore mountains. The  Pacific Spirit Regional Park serves as a green-belt between the campus and the city. The campus street plan is mostly in a grid of malls (some of which are pedestrian-only). Lower Mall and West Mall are in the southwestern part of the peninsula, with Main, East, and Wesbrook Malls northeast of them.

The campus is not within Vancouver's city limits, and therefore UBC is policed by the RCMP rather than the Vancouver Police Department. However, the Vancouver Fire Department provides service to UBC under a contract. In addition to UBC RCMP, there is also the UBC Campus Security that patrols the campus. Postage sent to any building on campus includes Vancouver in the address.

UBC Vancouver also has two satellite campuses within the City of Vancouver: at Vancouver General Hospital, for the medical sciences, and at Robson Square in downtown Vancouver, for part-time credit and non-credit programmes. UBC is also a partner in the consortium backing Great Northern Way Campus Ltd, and is affiliated with a group of adjacent theological colleges, which include the Vancouver School of Theology, Regent College, Carey Theological College and Corpus Christi College.

The campus is home to numerous gardens. The UBC Botanical Garden and Centre for Plant Research, the first UBC department, holds a collection of over 8000 different kinds of plants used for research, conservation and education. The UBC botanical garden's original site was at the "Old Arboretum". All that remains of it today are trees planted in 1916 by John Davidson. The old arboretum is now home to many buildings including the First Nations House of Learning. The Nitobe Memorial Garden, built to honour Japanese scholar Inazo Nitobe, the garden has been the subject of more than fifteen years' study by a UBC professor,  who believes its construction hides a number of impressive features, including references to Japanese philosophy and mythology, shadow bridges visible only at certain times of year, and positioning of a lantern filled with light at the exact date and time of Nitobe's death each year. The garden is behind the university's Asian Centre, which was built using steel girders from Japan's exhibit at Osaka Expo.

The campus also features the Chan Centre for the Performing Arts: a performing arts centre containing the Chan Shun Concert Hall, Telus Studio Theatre and the Royal Bank Cinema. It is often the site of convocation ceremonies and the filming location for the 4400 Center on the television show The 4400, as well as the Madacorp entrance set on Kyle XY. It has also been featured as the Cloud 9 Ballroom in the re-imagined Battlestar Galactica (Season 1, Episode 11: Colonial Day).

Since the mid-1980s UBC has worked with property developers to build several large residential developments throughout UBC's campus. Such developments include: Chancellor Place, Hampton Place, Hawthorn Place and Wesbrook Village.

Okanagan

The Okanagan Campus was established in 2005 on what was previously the North Kelowna Campus of Okanagan University College, next to Kelowna International Airport. It was founded in partnership with the Syilx Okanagan Nation and it lies on their ancestral and unceded territory.

The campus had a 2019 enrolment of 10,708 undergraduate and graduate students, and has its own academic Senate. UBC Okanagan offers 62 undergraduate and 19 graduate programs in a diversity of disciplines including Arts, Science, Fine Arts, Engineering, Nursing, Human Kinetics, Education, Management, Social Work and Interdisciplinary Graduate Studies. UBC's Faculty of Medicine delivers medical doctor training through the Southern Medical Program with facilities at UBC Okanagan and a clinical academic campus at Kelowna General Hospital.

From 2005 through 2012, the Okanagan campus completed a $450million CDN expansion with construction of several residential, teaching and research buildings. The expansion included the Charles E. Fipke Centre for Innovative Research, University Centre, the Engineering Management and Education building, the Arts and Sciences Centre, Reichwald Health Sciences Centre, and several new student residence buildings. The Commons building was opened in 2019, and in 2020 construction is underway on two additional student housing facilities—Nechako and Skeena residences.

In 2010, UBC Okanagan campus grew from 105 ha. to 208.6 ha. Like the Point Grey campus, the Okanagan campus attracts Canadian and international students.

UBC Okanagan campus plans to expand its campus in 2022 in downtown Kelowna. There will be three towers included in the project that stretches over two lots. The first tower will have underground parking for 260 vehicles, a ground floor that features an atrium, cafe and medical clinic, an eight-storey ‘academic podium’ with a larger footprint that acts as a stage for 24 storeys of student housing on top. Approximately 352 units of student housing will be available. The tower will be 34 storeys in total.

Libraries, archives and galleries

The UBC Library, which has 7.8million volumes, 2.1million e-books, more than 370,000 e-journals, and more than 700,000 items in locally produced digital collections, is Canada's second-largest academic library.  From 2014 to 2015, there were more than 3.8million on-campus visits and over 9.5million visits to its website.

The library has fifteen branches and divisions across the UBC Vancouver and UBC Okanagan campuses.

The former Main Library underwent construction and was renamed the Irving K. Barber Learning Centre. Opened in April 2008, the Learning Centre incorporates the centre heritage block of the old Main Library with two new expansion wings and features an automated storage and retrieval system (ASRS), the first of its kind in Canada.

UBC has a number of different collections that have been donated and acquired. Major General Victor Odlum CB, CMG, DSO, VD donated his library of 10,000 books, which has been housed in "the Rockwoods Centre Library" of the UBC Library since 1963. After Videomatica's 2011 closure, UBC and SFU acquired their $1.7-million collection. UBC received about 28,000 movie DVDs, 4,000 VHS titles and 900 Blu-ray discs which are housed at UBC Library's Koerner branch on the Vancouver campus. In 2014, renowned art collector and antiques specialist, Uno Langmann, donated the Uno Langmann Family Collection of B.C. Photographs, which consists of more than 18,000 rare and unique early photographs from the 1850s to the 1970s. It is considered the premiere private collection of early provincial photos, and an important illustrated history of early photographic methods. In 2016, the library acquired one of the world's most rare and extraordinary books, the Kelmscott Chaucer from 1896. The book was printed in a limited edition of only 438 copies, but there are only 48 copies in the world with its particular type of binding.

The Morris and Helen Belkin Art Gallery at UBC is mandated to research, exhibit, collect, publish, educate and develop programs in the field of contemporary art and in contemporary approaches to the practice of art history and criticism. The Belkin maintains and manages the university's art collection of over 5,000 objects, including the Outdoor Art Collection, and an archive of over 30,000 items. Works from the permanent collection and archives, with an emphasis on recent acquisitions, are exhibited on an annual basis and are also used by other institutions for research and loans. The Belkin has an active publication program and participates in programming that includes lectures, tours, concerts and symposia related to art history, criticism and curating.

Sustainability

UBC has been ranked in the Corporate Knights school rankings, which ranks universities based on how well they integrate sustainability into the learning experience. The rankings adopt a broad definition of sustainability which encompasses both environmental and social concerns. In the 2011 rankings, UBC was ranked second in the category: top 5 teaching programs. UBC's law school ranked fifth among Canadian law schools. The Sauder School of Business' MBA programs were ranked fourth in Canada. The same rankings placed the business school 11th in Canada for its undergraduate business program.

The Centre for Interactive Research on Sustainability (CIRS) building has been called North America's most sustainable, innovative, and high performance building.

The CIRS building was first proposed in 2000 and was the brainchild of John Robinson, a sustainable development research initiative professor. Robinson worked with faculty members from Emily Carr, Simon Fraser University, and British Columbia Institute of Technology as well as head architect Peter Busby to design the building. It cost 23million dollars to complete the 65,000 square foot building.

The CIRS building exhibits regenerative sustainability, which means the building improves the surrounding environment.  For example, it uses energy it obtains from the neighbouring Earth and Ocean Sciences (EOSC) Building to heat itself. The EOSC building uses roughly 1600 megawatts of heat and goes through ten air changes every hour, which wastes around 900 megawatts. The engineers who built the CIRS building saw this as an opportunity; the building takes the heat the EOSC building expels and uses 300 megawatts to heat itself before returning 600 megawatts to the EOSC building. In this way, the CIRS building restores its surrounding environment.

The CIRS building is designed to be net positive in four ways environmentally, meaning the processes or products that leave the building are more environmentally friendly than those that go into it. The best example of the building's net positivity is the building's wood holds nearly 600 tons of carbon – more carbon than the building's construction and maintenance created.
Other sustainable features of the CIRS building include:
 A water supply obtained entirely from rainwater
 An on-site sewage treatment facility that converts all waste created in the building to reusable water and compost
 The building's wood comes from trees killed by the pine beetle, thus, little logging was needed for construction
 Relies on mainly solar energy for electricity
 All areas of the building use natural lighting during the day.
The building integrates 'green' sustainable and humane features, i.e. not only does it have a small ecological footprint, it also serves as an environment for occupants to be happy, healthy, and productive. This is the direction the University of British Columbia is moving towards to continue their ideas of sustainable development.

Following the success of the CIRS, UBC's new Student Union Building, which opened in summer 2015, was also designed to adhere to the most stringent sustainability requirements. It achieves the LEED Platinum standard – with features that include triple glazing, solar-powered cooling, solar water heaters, radiant heating and cooling in floors, green roof technology, water-efficient landscaping that uses greywater, natural air ventilation, and a composting facility that processes up to 30 tonnes of organic waste each year.

Water Action Plan
As of 2019, UBC consumed about four billion litres of water a year, which could fill 1,600 Olympic-sized swimming pools.

To reduce this consumption, the UBC sustainability team created an initiative to conserve called the Water Action Plan in 2011 to reduce and recycle water on campus. Two landmarks for creating water sustainability are the CIRS and the C. K. Choi Building. The Centre for Interactive Sustainability (CIRS) building features a closed-loop water system where water is recycled and reused. On the other hand, the C. K. Choi Building for the Institute of Asian Research, consists of composting toilets, which reduce domestic water consumption. These toilets use an alternative other than using water for flushing and produce fertilizer that can be used for growing plants. Conclusively, these toilets allow for the conservation of water, landfill space, energy, and also the production of quality fertilizer.

Water conservation initiatives
For over 20 years, UBC has been implementing change and water consumption policies through two initiatives, ECOTrek and UBC Renew:

ECOTrek
ECOTrek is Canada's largest sustainability project which undertook an enormous water and energy saving initiative. This project included rebuilding almost 300 academic buildings in UBC. This project achieved a World Clean Energy nomination, which are honourable awards for successful projects in energy efficiency and renewable energy realm. The water management involved conducting changes to toilets, urinals, basins and water-cooled equipment to reduce the amount of water on campus. In addition, steam and water meters were installed on campus to quantify the water consumption to provide a clear depiction of the water use in each building.
UBC Renew
UBC Renew project involves renovating aging institutional buildings, instead of demolishing and building new buildings which can have negative impacts on the environment. Demolition can have major environmental impacts as it can pollute the soil, increase air pollutants, and increase water consumption. Renovating old buildings can save large volumes of water and save energy costs.

Community efforts
Beyond the UBC sustainability team, a student-driven initiative is taking place in making a bottled-water free campus in hopes of reducing bottled water on campus and to encourage students to engage in environmentally friendly behaviours. Production of bottled water puts strain on the environment and increases landfill space. According to the World Wide Fund for Nature 2001 report, about 1.5million tons of plastic is used for bottling 89billion litres of water each year.

Governance and academics

UBC's administration, as mandated by the University Act, is composed of a chancellor, convocation, board, senate, and faculties of the university. The board of governors manages property and revenue, while the senate manages the university's academic operation. Both are composed of faculty and students who are elected to the position. Degrees and diplomas are conferred by the convocation, which is composed of alumni, administrators, and faculty, with a quorum of twenty members. UBC also has a president, who is the university's chief executive officer and a member of the senate, board of governors, convocation, and also serves as vice chancellor. The president of the university is responsible for managing the academic operation of the university, including recommending appointments, calling meetings of faculties, and establishing committees.

Faculties and schools

UBC's academic activity is organized into "faculties" and "schools". UBC has twelve faculties at its Vancouver campus and seven at its Okanagan campus. UBC Vancouver has two academic colleges: Interdisciplinary Studies and Health Disciplines, while UBC Okanagan has a College of Graduate Studies. At the Vancouver campus, the Faculty of Arts, which dates back to the 1915 Fairview Campus, is the largest faculty with twenty departments and schools. With the split of the Faculty of Arts and Science in 1964, the Faculty of Science is the second largest faculty with nine departments. The Sauder School of Business is UBC's Faculty of Commerce and Business Administration. The School of Architecture offers a program accredited by the Canadian Architectural Certification Board at the bachelor level (B.Arch.) and the master's level (M.Arch.). , a new school was created: UBC Vancouver School of Economics in conjunction with the Sauder School of Business. The university's first inter-faculty school, the School of Biomedical Engineering, was established in 2017 as a partnership between the Faculties of Applied Science and Medicine.

In 2014, UBC created a new "International Programs" designation separate from the traditional definition of a faculty. To accompany this designation, the university created Vantage College to allow international students who do not meet the English language requirements for general admission to enter the university's transition program.

Dual undergraduate degree with Sciences Po
The dual degree program is a highly selective program in which undergraduate students earn two Bachelor of Arts degrees from both Sciences Po in France and UBC in four years. Previously, students could earn one Bachelor of Arts and one Bachelor of Commerce (Sauder School of Business); however, this program was discontinued with the last student intake occurring in September 2017. Currently, students in the dual degree program can only earn a Bachelor of Arts degree from UBC, along with a Bachelor of Arts degree from Sciences Po, which can both be in different majors pertaining to the social sciences. Students spend two years at one of three Sciences Po regional campuses in France (Le Havre, Menton, or Reims), each of which is devoted to a particular region of the world. After two years, students matriculate at UBC. Graduates are guaranteed admission to a Sciences Po graduate program within one-year of graduation.

Reputation

The University of British Columbia has ranked in a number of post-secondary rankings. In the 2022 Academic Ranking of World Universities rankings, the university ranked 44th in the world and second in Canada. The 2023 QS World University Rankings ranked the University 47th in the world, and third in Canada. The 2023 Times Higher Education World University Rankings ranked the University 40th in the world, and second in Canada. In the 2022–23 U.S. News & World Report Best Global University Ranking, the university ranked 35th in the world and second in Canada. The Canadian-based Maclean's magazine ranked the University of British Columbia third in their 2023 Canadian Medical Doctoral University category, and in their 2023 reputation survey. The university was ranked in spite of having opted out – along with several other universities in Canada – of participating in Maclean's graduate survey since 2006. In Newsweeks 2011 global university rankings, the university was ranked eighth among institutions outside the United States and second in Canada (after the University of Toronto).

Along with academic and research-based rankings, the university has also been ranked by publications that evaluate the employment prospects of its graduates. In the Times Higher Education's 2022 global employability ranking, the university ranked 36th in the world and third in Canada .

International partnerships 
UBC students can study abroad for a semester or a year at over 200 partner institutions such as ETH Zürich, University of Tokyo, UC Berkeley, Imperial College London, HEC Paris, Tsinghua University, University of Washington, Seoul National University, University of Sydney, IIT Delhi, National Taiwan University and many others.

Enrolment 
The mean admission average in 2013 for domestic first-year students was 89.5 percent. The acceptance rate for domestic applications in 2013 was 50.4 percent, of which 57.1 percent enrolled. In 2014/15, UBC employed 3,270 full-time Faculty members, 10,942 non-faculty members, and 8,031 students. It reported 871 unpaid employees.

Vancouver enrolment

Research

The University of British Columbia is a member of Universitas 21, an international association of research-led institutions and the only Canadian member of the Association of Pacific Rim Universities, a consortium of 42 leading research universities in the Pacific Rim. In 2017, the University of British Columbia had the second-largest sponsored research income (external sources of funding) out of any Canadian university, totalling C$577 million. In the same year, the university's faculty averaged a sponsored research income of $249,900, the eighth highest in the country, while graduate students averaged a sponsored research income of $55,200.

The university has been ranked on several bibliometric university rankings, which uses citation analysis to evaluate the impact a university has on academic publications. In 2019, the Performance Ranking of Scientific Papers for World Universities ranked UBC 27th in the world and second in Canada. The University Ranking by Academic Performance 2018–19 rankings placed the university 27th in the world and second in Canada.

The university operates and manages a number of research centres:
 In 1972, a consortium of the University of British Columbia and four other universities from Alberta and British Columbia established the Bamfield Marine Sciences Centre. Located on Vancouver Island, the centre provides year-round research facilities and technical assistance for biologists, ecologists and oceanographers. 
 The Peter Wall Institute for Advanced Studies is an interdisciplinary research institute for fundamental research in the Sciences, Social Sciences, and Humanities. 
 The UBC Farm is a  learning and research farm in UBC's South Campus area. It features Saturday Farm Markets from early June until early October, selling organic produce and eggs to the community.
 TRIUMF, a laboratory specializing in particle and nuclear physics, is also situated at the university. The name was formerly an acronym for Tri-University Meson Facility, but TRIUMF is now owned and operated by a consortium of eleven Canadian universities. The consortium runs TRIUMF through a contribution of funds from the National Research Council of Canada and makes TRIUMF's facilities available to Canadian scientists and to scientists from around the world.
 BC Centre on Substance Use (BCCSU) and UBC have established Professorships in Cannabis Science in 2018 following Canada's legalization of cannabis.
 The Centre for the Study of Democratic Institutions is a research institute for the teaching and study of innovation in democratic practice and institutions. Established in 2002, the centre conducts research and teaching in cooperation with scholars, public officials, NGOs and students. The centre is formally housed in the UBC School of Public Policy and Global Affairs (SPPGA), and operates in association with faculty in the UBC Department of Political Science. It was initially funded from the Merilees Chair through a donation by Gail and Stephen Jarislowsky.
The Stewart Blusson Quantum Matter Institute, one of three Canadian research institutes focused on quantum materials and technology research, was established in 2015 with the support of the Canada First Excellence Research Fund and a donation from Stewart Blusson.

In 2017, UBC inked a $3 million research agreement with Huawei for big data and fuel cell technology. The university refused to release the agreement without an access to information request.

Indigenous
UBC's Longhouse is the university's centre for Indigenous activities. The university has an associate dean of Indigenous Education, and has developed a governing board and senate policies as well as Aboriginal governed councils within the university structure. UBC offers degrees in First Nations and Indigenous Studies through a program in the Arts Faculty, and a Chinook Diploma Program in the Sauder School of Business; it also runs the Chinook Summer Biz Camp, to foster entrepreneurship among First Nations and Métis high school students. It hosts a Bridge Through Sport Program, Summer Science Program, Native Youth Program, and Cedar Day Camp and Afterschool Program. Its First Nations Forestry Initiatives were developed in partnership with specific Aboriginal communities to meet their needs in their more remote areas.

Finances
In 2012–13, UBC's budget exceeded $2billion, and the university posted balanced financial results for the fourth consecutive year through strategic revenue diversification, careful management of assets, and a continued focus on fundraising for projects across the university. Government grants account for approximately 45% of total revenues. Annual fundraising has nearly doubled in 5 years to reach $213million.

Tuition
Tuition fees vary significantly between Canadian citizens (and permanent residents) and international students. In addition, for both undergraduate and graduate programs, tuition rates vary among the university's faculties. Students must also pay for various living expenses such as housing, food and health care. , these expenses were estimated at around $13,000 CAD per academic year.

Undergraduate tuition
UBC tuition for 2012 was $4,700 before adding other mandatory administrative fees for a Canadian student in a basic 30-unit program, though various programs cost from $3,406 to $9,640. Tuition for international students is significantly higher (2.3–4.6 times higher than domestic students). In 2012, tuition for international students ranged from $16,245 CAD to $25,721 CAD.

In 2001–02, UBC had one of the lowest undergraduate tuition rates in Canada, at an average of $2,181 CAD per year for a full-time programme due to a government-instituted tuition freeze.

In 2001, the BC Liberal party defeated the NDP in British Columbia and lifted the tuition freeze. In 2002–03 undergraduate and graduate tuition rose by an average of 30%, and up to 40% in some faculties. This has led to better facilities, but also to student unrest and contributed to a teaching assistant union strike.

UBC again increased tuition by 30% in the 2003–04 year, again by approximately 15% in the 2004–05 season, and 2% in the 2005–06 and 2006–07 years. Increases were lower than expected because, in the 2005 Speech from the Throne, the government announced tuition increases would be capped to inflation. In 2006–07, the Canadian average undergraduate tuition fee was $4,347 and the BC average was $4,960. In 2014, the board of governors passed a one-time 10% tuition increase for all new incoming international students. In December 2015, UBC's board of governors passed a motion increasing international tuition by more than 46.8% for the academic years 2016–17, 2017–18, 2018–2019. This announcement was met with indignation by many of the university's students as this was the second major increase in international tuition in less than a year, taking total international student tuition fee increases to above 60% within 4 years (minimum international tuition will be benchmarked at $35,071 CAD in the year 2018–19).

Graduate tuition
In the academic year 2019/2020, graduate programs assess tuition fees that vary significantly, depending on the program and the student's citizenship. International students without external funding that meet the general eligibility criteria will be supported with guaranteed funding of up to $3,200 per year. Tuition for professional Master's programs varies.

Student life

Student representation
The Alma Mater Society of the University of British Columbia, or AMS, represents UBC undergraduate students within the Vancouver campus. The society's mandate is to improve the quality of educational, social, and personal lives of UBC students. The AMS lobbies the UBC administration on behalf of the student body, provides services such as the AMS/GSS Health and Dental Plan, supports and administers student clubs, and maintains the Student Union Building (aka SUB) and the services it houses. A constituency (undergraduate society) exists within each school and faculty of the university and acts as the subsidiary of the AMS within those schools and faculties.

The Graduate Student Society (GSS), which operates as an independent entity, represents graduate students. A council representing each graduate program and an executive elected by graduate students as a whole governs the GSS.

The university also has elected student representatives sitting on, as voting members, the board of governors (three student representatives) and the academic senate (18 student representatives), as laid out in the British Columbia University Act. Although the university is the official body that elects the students, the university delegates these representative elections to the AMS.

On the Okanagan Campus, the Students' Union Okanagan, or UBCSUO, is the elected representation of the student body. Composed of a board of directors and executive team, the UBCSUO lobbies the administration and provincial government on behalf of the student body, manages the student health and dental plan, as well as hosts social programming throughout the year. The Student Union Offices are located within the University Centre Building. In the wake of the COVID-19 Pandemic, the SUO initiated the Emergency Bursary Program which supported UBC students with nearly $1,000,000 in emergency funding.

Student demographics
In the 2020–21 academic year, females made up 57 per cent of UBC Vancouver's student body, and 53 per cent of UBC Okanagan's student body.

Student facilities

The heart of student activity at UBC Vancouver is the centrally located Student Union Building (SUB), which houses offices of many AMS student clubs, over a dozen restaurants and cafés, a pub ("The Gallery"), a nightclub ("The Pit"), the 425-seat Norman Bouchard Memorial Theatre ("The Norm Theatre"), several shops, and a post office. The AMS runs the majority of the SUB's outlets and shops; however, UBC Food Services' recent addition of major corporate outlets has generated controversy. The SUB Art Gallery contains mostly students' works. An underground bus loop to replace the "Grassy Knoll" beside the SUB did not receive funding by Translink.
As a result, the administration has cancelled the bus loop project, although the rest of the renovations of the University Boulevard Neighbourhood are still under consideration.

On June 1, 2015, the new Student Union Building—called the AMS Student Nest or simply the "Nest"—opened to students, largely replacing and extending the old SUB in functionality. The Nest, built for $107million, is much larger than its predecessor, and has numerous amenities including a performance centre, an art exhibition space, a large ballroom, a three-storey climbing wall, radio broadcast facilities, a daycare, and a 10,740 square foot rooftop garden and public space with a water feature and outdoor seating. Many of the restaurants as well as the Pit Pub have moved to the Nest under their original name or with new names. AMS Student Nest was designed by B+H Architects in collaboration with DIALOG, opened on June 1, 2015, on the University of British Columbia (UBC) campus in Vancouver, British Columbia, Canada.  The building has an area of 23 700m² with a capacity of 300 people. The structure of the building was worked on by RJC Engineers using primarily wood and steel construction.
Other student facilities on campus include the Ladha Science Student Centre (funded through a donation from Abdul Ladha, a levy on Science undergraduate students, the VP Students, and the dean of Science) and the Meekison Arts Student Space in the Faculty of Art's Buchanan D building. The UBC Bookstore's locations on the Vancouver campus: the main store at 6200 University Boulevard and a store at Sauder School of Business join the stores at the Okanagan and Robson Square Campuses in offering a variety of products and services. The bookstores return a dividend to UBC each year, which is re-invested in the campus or in student and community organizations.

Greek organizations
While UBC's Greek system is somewhat smaller than its counterparts in the United States, UBC's 19 Greek organizations make up Canada's largest and most active Greek system. The Alma Mater Society recognizes an InterFraternal Council (IFC) as a club, and weekly meetings of the fraternities under IFC take place at their respective fraternity houses. Greek life has its own division within UBC REC and intense competition between the nine Fraternities for the title of top Athletic Fraternity occur.

There are eleven international fraternities on campus, the first of which was Zeta Psi, in January 1926. Although its disputed, Alpha Delta Phi soon came to campus and chartered 3 months later. However, Zeta Psi and Alpha Delta Phi were preceded by several local fraternities on campus. Other fraternities include Alpha Epsilon Pi, Delta Kappa Epsilon, Psi Upsilon, Sigma Chi, Beta Theta Pi, Phi Delta Theta, Phi Gamma Delta, Kappa Sigma, Zeta Psi, and the newly added Phi Kappa Sigma.

The National Panhellenic Conference (NPC) member organizations (sororities) on campus are overseen by the Panhellenic Council. All sororities have a chapter room in the Panhellenic House on Wesbrook Mall; the building also offers housing for 72 college women, with preference given to sorority members.

The eight sororities on the Vancouver campus include Alpha Delta Pi, Alpha Gamma Delta, Alpha Omicron Pi, Alpha Phi, Delta Gamma, Gamma Phi Beta, Kappa Alpha Theta, and Kappa Kappa Gamma. The current Panhellenic total is 104. Chapter meetings are held in the chapter's respective rooms each week or in classrooms and Greek-wide or campus-wide events are attended by members of all the sororities and fraternities. Formal recruitment for the sororities begins during the third week of September and is a five-day process consisting of: tours (first two days), invitationals (third and fourth days) and preference. The formal recruitment process ends with Bid Day, where membership bids from each sorority are distributed to prospective members.

Phrateres has traditionally been affiliated with the Greek system since its installation at UBC in 1935. Historical records indicate that for many years, members identified themselves, and were recognized as Greek. Members interacted with fraternities on a similar basis as the sororities, and participated in many Greek events, such as Songfest and exchanges. However, they presently operate as a self-governing organization under the Alma Mater Society with the closure of their international headquarters in 2001.

Both campuses also have chapters of Sigma Phi Delta and Alpha Omega Epsilon, a professional engineering fraternity and sorority respectively. None of the four chapters are affiliated with the other Greek organizations on campus.

Alpha Kappa Psi (professional business fraternity) too has an active chapter at UBC since 2009. It consists of students from all faculty. They do not have a house and are not affiliated with any other Greek organization on campus.

Alpha Phi Omega (Community service fraternity) founded its first chapter in Canada at UBC in 2015.

Moreover, UBC was ranked among Canada's top party schools by the website Ask Men. UBC was ranked eighth.

Residences

The UBC Point Grey campus has a resident population of about 10,041 students who live in an unincorporated area, outside the City of Vancouver known as Electoral Area A within and partly administered by Metro Vancouver. Neighbouring the University Endowment Lands, on-campus residential services are provided by the Province of BC and by UBC. Emergency Planning is administered by Metro Vancouver. Because UBC is not in a municipality, there is no mayor, council, or other democratic municipal representation for on-campus residents, although residents can vote for the director of Electoral Area A. British Columbia's Residential Tenancy Act does not protect UBC residents because university accommodations for students and employees are exempt.

UBC has forecast the need for 6,400 new on-campus beds between 2008 and 2028 "to maintain the current availability of student housing choices in the face of on-going pressures in the Vancouver rental market". From 2009 to 2014, UBC added 1,471 beds for student residents. In 2015, UBC plans to increase the cost of on-campus student housing by 20%, with the exception of year-round residences.

, there are three dormitory style residences on campus, primarily for first and second-year students: Totem Park, Place Vanier, and Orchard Commons.

Totem Park, housing about 2,129 students, consists of nine dormitory buildings (Nootka, Dene, Haida, Salish, Kwakiutl, Shuswap, həm̓ləsəm̓, q̓ələχən, c̓əsnaʔəm), and a Commons Block (Coquihalla). All houses, except Shuswap and c̓əsnaʔəm, are co-ed, with alternating men's and women's floors; Shuswap and c̓əsnaʔəm have co-ed floors. The həm̓ləsəm̓ and q̓ələχən houses were opened to Totem Park residents in September 2011 and have single rooms with semi-private or private washrooms in contrast to the other houses' communal floor washrooms. c̓əsnaʔəm was opened to Totem Park residents in September 2017 and has single rooms with communal bathrooms.

Place Vanier, housing 1,370 people, consists of 12 blocks constructed in 1959 (Robson House), 1960 (Okanagan, Sherwood Lett, Mackenzie, Ross, Hamber, and Mawdsley Houses), 1961 (Kootenay House), 1968 (Cariboo and Tweedsmuir Houses), 2002 (Korea-UBC House) and 2003 (Tec de Monterrey-UBC House). The buildings vary from male and female only, to alternating gender floors, as well as fully mixed floors. The residences have single and double rooms, and each floor has a lounge and communal bathrooms.

Orchard Commons consists of two apartment style buildings, Braeburn house and Bartlett house, with the latter containing a common dining hall and reception area. Orchard Commons houses 1,047 students, with the majority staying in connected single rooms on mixed gender floors, where two same-gender residents share a washroom connecting their adjacent rooms.

Students nineteen and older have suite-style residence options on the Point Grey campus. The Gage Towers consist of three 17-floor towers (North, South and East) primarily for second, third, and fourth-year undergraduate students. It consists of three interconnected towers (North, South, and East) as well as single student housing (both studio, and apartment) in a building. The towers are composed of "quads": four separate pods, each consisting of six individual bedrooms, a bathroom and a kitchen-dining area.

Acadia Park and University Apartments are for student families and couples (where one is a UBC student) and are administered on a year-round basis.

Next to the Acadia Park residence area on the east part of campus is Fairview Crescent, a residence primarily for second- and third-year undergraduate students and many graduate students. The residence consists of an L-shaped pedestrian-only street lined with 4, 5 and six-student (a mix of single-sex and co-ed) townhouses. The Beanery coffee shop is in the middle of the residence. Within a 5-minute walk from Fairview Crescent is the Fraser Hall residence which houses approximately 200 students. Fairview Crescent and Fraser Hall are both governed by the Fairview and Fraser Residence Association.

The Thunderbird residences are primarily for graduate students and fourth-year undergraduate students; they are at the academic core campus' southern edge. The Ritsumeikan-UBC House is a residence with a Japanese cultural setting, named for Ritsumeikan University. It houses Japanese exchange students and Canadian students, who participate in unique inter-cultural programmes. UBC's Urasenke Japanese tea ceremony club uses the residence's tatami room for practice sessions. Two Canadian students are typically paired with two Japanese exchange students.

Marine Drive Residence is on the west side of campus, slightly south of Place Vanier. The first phase, consisting of Building 1 (an 18-floor tower) and Building 2 (a five-floor building commonly called the "Podium") opened in fall 2005. In February 2006, the board of governors approved plans for Marine Drive's second phase, putting an end to the debacle caused by concerns over the view of Wreck Beach (Phase I's Building 1 was reduced from 20 floors to 18). Additionally, building 1 contains the Simon K.Y. Lee Global Lounge and Resource Centre. Phase II consists of Buildings 4 through 6 (two towers and another "Podium", respectively), and also the Commonsblock. Buildings 4 through 6 were all open to students . A separate Commonsblock was completed in summer 2009, and has similar services to the Commonsblock of other residences, such as exercise, game, and study rooms. Construction at Marine Drive was completed in February 2010, with the opening of The Point Grill restaurant in Building 4.

The Ponderosa Commons and Orchard Commons residences, completed in 2016, and Brock Commons, opened in the Summer of 2017. The Ponderosa Commons is a multi-purpose building designed for student housing but is also a place for students to gather, study, or eat. The Ponderosa Commons house a Mercante, a popular pizzeria, and Harvest, a popular small-sized grocery shop.

The university has two colleges to accommodate graduate students, postdoctoral fellows and visiting scholars: St. John's College and Green College.

Brock Commons Tallwood House opened in 2017, becoming the tallest mass timber building in the world.

Athletics

The University of British Columbia's sports teams are called the Thunderbirds. The Thunderbirds participate in the U Sports Canada West Universities Athletic Association for most varsity sports. However, several varsity teams at UBC compete in the National Association of Intercollegiate Athletics. , UBC considered joining the NCAA Division II. With a long history of competing in sports, the Thunderbirds have garnered a number of championships. In particular, the women swimmers who had represented UBC had brought back 22 conference championships and 16 national championships.

The University of British Columbia has a number of athletic facilities open to both their varsity teams as well as to their students. The stadium with the largest seating capacity at UBC is the Doug Mitchell Thunderbird Sports Centre. The Doug Mitchell Thunderbird Sports Centre is home to the varsity ice hockey teams and was also used as a venue for the 2010 Winter Olympics. Other facilities at UBC include Thunderbird Stadium, home to the university's football and soccer varsity teams, UBC Aquatic Centre, home to the university's swimming teams, the War Memorial Gymnasium, home to the university's basketball and volleyball varsity teams and Thunderbird Park, home to the university's many other outdoor varsity teams.

The university has also had a long history of sending a number of students to represent their countries at the Olympics. Since having its first athlete sent to the Olympics in 1928, a total of 231 individuals from UBC have represented their respective countries at the Olympics. The total number of individual medals athletes from UBC had won was 61, with 19 gold, 21 silver and 24 bronze. The majority of these medals won had come from the sport of rowing.

Marching band
UBC's marching band, the Thunderbird Marching Band, was founded in September 2012 and is entirely student-run. The band performs at various Thunderbirds football, basketball, rugby, and hockey games, as well as other campus events. It is the only university-level marching band in Western Canada.

Fight songs
Notable among a number of songs commonly played and sung at various events such as commencement and convocation, and athletic games are: "Hail, U.B.C" with words and music by Harold King, "High on Olympus" with words by D. C. Morton and music by J. C. F. Haeffner. and "Hail, UBC!" (2009) with words and music by Steve Chatman.

Campus events

A small number of large-scale, campus-wide events occur annually at UBC which are organized by university institutions, the AMS, and student constituencies of various faculties and departments. Additionally, a number of unofficial traditions exist at UBC: jumping from the Aquatic Centre's 10-metre diving board late at night and repainting the Engineering cairn so as to advertise other clubs.

Several group athletic events take place at UBC every year. Storm the Wall is an intramural relay race put on by UBC Recreation in April, culminating in the climbing of a  wall. Day of the Longboat is an intramural event put on at the end of September/early October by UBC Recreation. It is a major voyageur canoe race with teams competing in a 2 km paddle around the waters of Jericho Sailing Centre. The program is operated by over 120 volunteer students and staff who are responsible for operating every aspect of this program. UBC Recreation's student administrators fill various roles including event planning, sport officiating, public relations and building supervision.

Faculty constituencies, such as the Arts Undergraduate Society (AUS) and Science Undergraduate Society (SUS), hold events annually. Many of the major constituencies, such as for Arts, Science, and Engineering, hold their own faculty weeks to celebrate their faculties. The events may include keynote speeches, merchandise sales, and dances. Arts County Fair was an annual concert and party on the last day of classes in April, put on by the AUS and occurring at Thunderbird Stadium. Past headliners have included Sam Roberts, The New Pornographers, and Metric. Due to increasing financial difficulties (mostly resulting from mounting security and related costs) the AUS announced they would not continue the event in 2008. In its place, the Alma Mater Society of UBC hosted the AMS Block Party to celebrate the end of classes.

During the Spring exam season, the Ski & Board Club organizes the Undie Run, a charity event that encourages people to donate their clothes to the Big Brothers & Sisters organization in Vancouver. Students meet at the Student Union Building, remove the clothes they are going to donate, and then run around campus in their underwear. Students run through places like the Irvin K. Barber Centre and Place Vanier Residence before ending at the Martha Piper Plaza fountain.

To celebrate the beginning of classes, UBC Orientations organizes several events for first-year students, such as Imagine UBC, GALA, and UBC Jump Start. Imagine UBC is an orientation day and pep rally for first-year undergraduate students that replaces the first day of class after Labour Day at UBC Vancouver.

Model United Nations
In March 2012, UBC was the partner Host University of the Harvard World Model United Nations Conference (WorldMUN 2012 Vancouver). As the world's largest student-organized Model UN conference, this was also the largest student conference to have ever been organized by UBC and the largest student conference on Canadian soil. There were 2,200 student delegates and nearly 200 faculty advisors from 270 universities from over 60 countries. The organizing committee amassed over 500 student volunteers from across the UBC campus and the local student community to execute the week-long event.

Notable people

Throughout UBC's history, faculty, alumni, and former students have played prominent roles in many different fields. Many UBC alumni and faculty have gone on to win awards including eight Nobel Prizes and 74 Rhodes Scholarships.

Former alumni have won Nobel Prizes: Robert Mundell (Economic Sciences) who graduated from the UBC Department of Economics and Bertram Brockhouse (Physics). Five former faculty members of the UBC have also received a Nobel Prize: Michael Smith (Chemistry), Har Gobind Khorana (Physiology or Medicine), Daniel Kahneman (Economics), Hans G. Dehmelt (Physics), and Carl Wieman (Physics).

Many former students have gained local and national prominence in government. The university has produced three Canadian Prime Ministers: John Turner, Kim Campbell, and Justin Trudeau. The leader of the Liberal Party of Canada, Member of Parliament and the 23rd Prime Minister of Canada Justin Trudeau completed his BEd. at UBC in 1998. Canadian Prime Minister Joe Clark briefly attended UBC law. George Stanley, the Lieutenant Governor of New Brunswick and creator of the Canadian flag had also served as faculty. Alumni Mike Harcourt, Glen Clark and Ujjal Dosanjh have been premiers of British Columbia:, People of UBC Law have also served on the Supreme Court of Canada: former faculty member Beverley McLachlin and alumnus Frank Iacobucci.

Other examples include:
 Canadian academic, science broadcaster and environmental activist David Suzuki was a professor in UBC's genetics department from 1963 until his retirement in 2001. 
 Joel Bakan, author of The Corporation: The Pathological Pursuit of Profit and Power, is a professor at the Faculty of Law.
 Psychologist Albert Bandura is an alumnus of UBC.
 Actress Evangeline Lilly attended UBC and earned her degree in international relations. 
 Singer/songwriter Dan Mangan attended UBC, earning a BA in English Literature. 
 Author and historian Pierre Berton majored in history at UBC. 
 Man-in-Motion Rick Hansen was the first student with a physical disability to graduate in physical education from UBC. 
 Director of Artificial Intelligence at Tesla Andrej Karpathy graduated from UBC in 2011 with a MSc in computer science.
 Opera singers Judith Forst, Ben Heppner and Lance Ryan studied music at UBC. 
 David Cheriton, who graduated from UBC in 1973, is a Google founding investor and computer science professor at Stanford University.
 Science fiction writer William Gibson, who coined the term "cyberspace", earned his bachelor's degree in English at UBC.
Actor Manny Jacinto graduated with a degree in civil engineering.
Clint Hocking, creative director of Far Cry 2 and Watch Dogs: Legion, graduated received a Master of Fine Arts in creative writing at UBC.
Gabor Maté, an expert in childhood development and trauma, earned his BA at UBC.
 Kiril Petkov, 17th Prime Minister of Bulgaria, and the first alumnus to become a head of government outside of Canada

UBC alumni have also held important positions in the academia. Notable examples are: 
 Indira Samarasekera, twelfth president of the University of Alberta; 
 Amit Chakma, president of the University of Western Ontario; 
 Muriel Kennett Wales, believed to have been the first Irish-born woman to earn a PhD in pure mathematics.
 John H. McArthur, dean emeritus of the Harvard Business School;
 Thomas Franck (lawyer), who was the Murry and Ida Becker Professor of Law at New York University and former editor-in-chief of the American Journal of International Law; 
 David H. Turpin, sixth president of the University of Victoria and thirteenth president of the University of Alberta; 
 Nemkumar Banthia, a fellow of the Royal Society of Canada and CEO of IC-IMPACTS. 
 Michiel Horn, member of the Royal Society of Canada and professor emeritus of history at York University;
 Monica Lam, a computer science professor at Stanford University and founder of Moka5;
 Frank Iacobucci, a Puisne Justice on the Supreme Court of Canada.
 Alison Mountz, Canada Research Chair in Global Migration at Wilfrid Laurier University and member of the Royal Society of Canada's College of New Scholars, Artists, and Scientists.
 Amalendu Chandra, Indian theoretical physical chemist, professor of chemistry at Indian Institute of Technology, Kanpur, fellow of the IAS, and INSA, Shanti Swarup Bhatnagar Prize for Science and Technology award.

Arms

See also

 CITR-FM
 UBC Botanical Garden and Centre for Plant Research
 UBC Library
 UBC Okanagan
 List of Canadian universities by endowment
 Sexual Violence and Misconduct Policy Act (British Columbia)

Notes

References

Further reading
 William A. Bruneau, A Matter of Identities: A History of the UBC Faculty Association, 1920–1990. Vancouver: University of British Columbia Faculty Association, 1990.
 
 Eric Damer and Herbert Rosengarten. UBC: The First 100 Years. Vancouver: Friesens, 2009.
 Michiel Horn."Under the Gaze of George Vancouver: The University of British Columbia and the Provincial Government, 1913–1939." BC Studies 83 (Autumn 1989).
 William C. Gibson Wesbrook & His University (Vancouver: University of British Columbia Press)
 Sheldon Goldfarb The Hundred-Year Trek: A History of Student Life at UBC. Victoria: Heritage House, 2017.
 H.T. Logan, Tuum Est: A History of the University of British Columbia. Vancouver: University of British Columbia, 1958.
 Wayne Skene. "UBC: a Portrait." Vancouver: Tribute Books, 2003.
 Lee Stewart. "It's Up to You": Women at UBC in the Early Years. Vancouver: University of British Columbia Press, 1990.
 George Woodcock & Tim Fitzharris. The University of British Columbia – A Souvenir. (Toronto: Oxford University Press, 1986).

External links

 Official website
 
 UBC Photograph Collection – A visual record of UBC's growth and development, from UBC Library Digital Collections

 
1890 establishments in British Columbia
Educational institutions established in 1890
Educational institutions established in 1915
Gothic Revival architecture in Vancouver
Universities in British Columbia
British Columbia